Kaubi may refer to several places in Estonia:
Kaubi, Saare County, village in Estonia
Kaubi, Valga County, village in Estonia
Kaubi, Võru County, village in Estonia